Sarah Mallais (born January 11, 1989 as Sarah Berthelot) is a Canadian curler from Moncton, New Brunswick.

Career
In her junior years, Mallais represented New Brunswick at the 2007 Canada Games. The team narrowly missed the playoffs, finishing with a 3–2 record. She also represented NB at the 2006 Canadian Junior Curling Championships where the team went 5–6.

Mallais lost the final of the 2009 provincial championship as second for Mary Jane McGuire. She played in the 2010 Sobeys Slam as lead for the Melissa Adams rink. They won no games and finished 0–3 in the triple knockout. Skipping her own team in 2016, she lost in the semifinal of the 2016 New Brunswick Scotties Tournament of Hearts to former teammate Adams. The following year in 2017, Team Mallais finished the round robin in first place, directly advancing them to the final. However, Mallais would once again come up short to Adams in a 9–6 decision. Mallais would also lose the final of the 2018 and 2019 provincial championships as well, to Sylvie Quillian and Andrea Crawford respectively. In 2020, she failed to make the playoffs at the 2020 New Brunswick Scotties Tournament of Hearts after a 2–3 round robin record.

Mallais joined the Marlee Powers rink out of Nova Scotia halfway through the 2021–22 season as one of Powers' members Emily Dwyer was travelling for work with the World Curling Federation.

Personal life
Mallais is married to fellow curler Jeremy Mallais and they have two children, Zayn and Roen. She works as an Informatics Coordinator at Perinatal New Brunswick.

Teams

References

External links

Curlers from New Brunswick
Living people
Sportspeople from Moncton
1989 births
Canadian women curlers
Sportspeople from Saint John, New Brunswick